Carlos Heitor Cony (March 14, 1926 – January 5, 2018) was a Brazilian journalist and writer. He was a member of the Brazilian Academy of Letters (Portuguese: Academia Brasileira de Letras).

Cony viewed himself as center-leftist and faced persecution under the military government in the 1960s.  Four of his works were adapted to movies. He was a columnist at the Brazilian newspaper Folha de S.Paulo.

References

External links
Folha
Mertin-litag 
BBC

1926 births
2018 deaths
Brazilian male writers
Brazilian journalists
Male journalists
Members of the Brazilian Academy of Letters
Writers from Rio de Janeiro (city)
Brazilian columnists
Deaths from multiple organ failure
20th-century Brazilian people